Nazia Khanum, OBE, DL (born 1943) is a Bangladeshi-born British management consultant, researcher, Director of Equality in Diversity, non-executive director for NHS Luton and chair of various voluntary community organisations.

Early life
Khanum was born in Barisal, Partition of Bengal (now Bangladesh), British India. Her exact date of birth is unknown because during that period birth certificates were not given unless they were specifically requested. She was named by her father Late Shamsul Ulama (Sons of Scholar) Mawlana Naseer Ahmed Khan, a graduate from Aligarh Muslim University in India, double gold medalists. While studying there, he played an active role in the anti-British movement. 
He was the superintendent of the Alyah Madrasah in Calcutta (www.aliah.ac.in/), and served from 1925 to 1935 at Bhola Ulum Hadis Kamil Mastars Madrasah (installed in 1913) was a member of the Congress in Calcutta under Mahatma Gandhi, and was an active  in the anti-British movement (1905).  Later in 1925 he served in Bhola Islamia Madrasa presently known as Bhola Darul Hadis Kamil-Masters Madrasa (established in 1913). in last decade of 17th century Nazia's grand father came from Persia for business trade and spread education in India, later he settled in Southern part of Shabazpur a remote village of Hizla-Muladi of Barisal under Mughals. Nazia's father moved to Charfassion with his family from South Shahbazpur in British regime. Her father died in 1951 when she was very young. She moved with her family to Charfassion, Bhola and later Dhaka where she was brought up. In the early 1980s, she brought her family to Luton, Bedfordshire, England.

Education and career
Khanum has an BA and MA in political science from the University of Dhaka, and a PhD in history from the School of Oriental and African Studies, University of London.

She worked over a long period as a lecturer and later as an assistant professor in Eden Girls' College and the University of Dhaka in Bangladesh.

In 1996, Khanum set up an independent international equal opportunities/diversity management, research and training consultancy. She is a non-executive director for NHS Luton.

Since 1983, Khanum has been involved in community empowerment through her work with diverse communities, across the United Kingdom to promote their development and empowerment. She has extensive senior management experience with five English local authorities (Ealing, Tower Hamlets, Bedfordshire, GLC and ILEA). She is on the boards of several key decision-making and community-empowerment organisations, including: non-executive director of Luton Primary Care Trust. She chairs several community groups in Luton She is on the boards of several key decision-making and community-empowerment organisations, including: non-executive director of Luton Primary Care Trust, member of the corporation  and governor of Luton Sixth Form College. Chair of Luton All-Women's Centre, Luton Multi-Cultural Women's Coalition, including Luton Bangladesh Helping Hand and Purbachal – the Eastern Sky. She is a member of the Government's Muslim Women's Advisory Group and a government equality ambassador for the Eastern Region.

Khanum was a government adviser. on issues relating to ethnic minorities. In 2006, Khanum began a research study, for the Home Office and Metropolitan Police Service, of forced marriage in Luton. Published in March 2008, the study found that support organisations in Luton were approached with enquiries about forced marriage more than 300 times each year. The results suggest that several thousand young women are the victims of forced marriages in Britain each year.

Awards and recognition
In 2006, Khanum was appointed an Officer of the Order of the British Empire (OBE) in the 2006 New Year Honours for her services to equal opportunities and community relations. She holds an honorary doctorate from University of Bedfordshire.

Personal life
Khanum is married to David Cheesman, a professor of society and development at Sheffield Hallam University. Their son, Tareen, has an MSc in economics from the London School of Economics and Political Science, University of London. In November 2002, Khanum and her husband performed their first Hajj (the largest Islamic pilgrimage to Mecca, Saudi Arabia).

See also
 British Bangladeshi
 List of British Bangladeshis

References

External links
 Report on Forced Marriage in the UK. Centre for Criminal Justice & Human Rights. 14 March 2008

1943 births
Living people
Date of birth missing (living people)
Bangladeshi Muslims
British Muslims
Bangladeshi emigrants to England
British people of Bangladeshi descent
Naturalised citizens of the United Kingdom
British activists
British women activists
British management consultants
British special advisers
British women academics
British Asian writers
Muslim writers
21st-century British writers
21st-century British women writers
Deputy Lieutenants of Bedfordshire
School governors
People from Barisal
People from Dhaka
People from Luton
University of Dhaka alumni
Alumni of SOAS University of London
Academic staff of Eden Mohila College
Officers of the Order of the British Empire